Aurora is the name of two places in the U.S. state of New York:
Aurora, Cayuga County, New York (a village) 
Aurora, Erie County, New York (a town)